Jubilation is an album by guitarist Randy Johnston which was recorded in 1992 and released on the Muse label in 1994.

Reception

The AllMusic review by Ron Wynn stated "He has a fluid style, plays in the full-toned, relaxed, taut fashion of Wes Montgomery and Kenny Burrell, and has the versatility to handle blues, soul-jazz and interpretations of show tunes. ... Finely tuned, expertly performed light jazz with a touch of funk, soul and blues".

Track listing
All compositions by Randy Johnson except where noted
 "Jubilation" (Junior Mance) – 4:08
 "One for Detroit" – 5:48
 "You Are Too Beautiful" (Richard Rodgers, Lorenz Hart) – 7:33
 "Willow Weep for Me" (Ann Ronell) – 9:09
 "Rolling at the Summit" – 4:38
 "Angela" (Dom Minasi) – 7:14
 "Come Rain or Come Shine" (Harold Arlen, Johnny Mercer) – 5:30
 "9 W Blues" – 6:55
 "Baby, You Should Know It" (Ben Tucker, Bob Dorough) – 6:31

Personnel
Randy Johnston – guitar
Eric Alexander – tenor saxophone (tracks 1, 2 & 6)
Bruce Barth – piano 
Nat Reeves – bass 
Michael Carvin – drums

References

Muse Records albums
Randy Johnston (musician) albums
1994 albums
Albums recorded at Van Gelder Studio